Acanthocephalus benthamianus is a species of plant in the family Asteraceae and is found in Asia specifically Afghanistan, Iran, Kazakhstan, Kyrgyzstan, Pakistan, Tadzhikistan, Turkmenistan and Uzbekistan.

References

Cichorieae